VLF Automotive is a small American-based automotive company formed in January 2016. It was founded as VL Automotive in 2012 by Bob Lutz and Gilbert Villarreal, then renamed after Henrik Fisker joined the company.

Company history
The company was founded by designer and entrepreneur Henrik Fisker, ex-General Motors vice-chairman Bob Lutz and industrialist Gilbert Villarreal. The company's name is taken from the initials of their surnames.

In 2013 they displayed the Destino, its first model, based on the Fisker Karma, at the North American International Auto Show in Detroit.

In 2016 they debuted the Force 1, a 745 hp American sports car at the North American International Auto Show.

Products

VLF Destino

The VLF Destino four-door sedan was first shown in January 2013, heavily based on the Fisker Karma, but fitted with a 6.2 L V8 gasoline engine rather than the electric power of the Karma.

Sales of the Destino were scheduled to commence in the second half of 2015, with cars to be built in Auburn Hills in Michigan, but the company only obtained twenty Fisker Karma "gliders" and reported 100 orders by May 2013. At the January 2014 Detroit Autoshow, the company announced that production was delayed due to the ongoing restructuring of Fisker.

VLF Force 1

The company announced production of a limited edition 745 HP American sports car Force 1 V10, limited to 50 by third quarter 2016. The car was a Coach Built Dodge Viper.

VLF Rocket V8
In 2018, VLF partnered with Galpin Auto Sports to produce the Rocket V8, a coach built Ford Mustang that is to be co built by both VLF and Galpin Auto Sports.

HUMVEE C-Series

Beginning in 2017, VLF is contracting a version of the HMMWV/Hummer H1 for the non-Americas market with limited run of 100 units per year via contract from AM General. Markets include China, Europe and the Middle East. AM General had announced  offering the C-Series as a kit for sale in 2012, but cancelled the project.

See also
 Henrik Fisker
 Bob Lutz
 Fisker Coachbuild (2005–2007)
 Fisker Automotive (2007–2014)
 VIA Motors

References

External links

Coachbuilders of the United States
Car manufacturers of the United States
Motor vehicle manufacturers based in Michigan
Henrik Fisker
Luxury motor vehicle manufacturers